Leonardo Sebastián Melazzi Pinela (born 4 February 1991) is a Uruguayan footballer who currently plays for Rampla Juniors.

National team
He has been capped by the Uruguay national under-20 football team for the 2011 South American Youth Championship and for the pre-squad for the 2011 FIFA U-20 World Cup.

International goals

|- bgcolor=#DFE7FF
| 1. || 24 October 2010 || Estadio Atanasio Girardot, Medellín, Colombia ||  || 2–2 || 2–2 || Copa Alcaldía de Medellín||
|}

References

External links
 

Living people
1991 births
Uruguayan footballers
Uruguay under-20 international footballers
Uruguayan expatriate footballers
Danubio F.C. players
Genoa C.F.C. players
Centro Atlético Fénix players
Miramar Misiones players
FC Lugano players
FC Chiasso players
Sud América players
Deportes Iquique footballers
Chilean Primera División players
Serie A players
Uruguayan Primera División players
Swiss Challenge League players
Expatriate footballers in Switzerland
Expatriate footballers in Chile
Expatriate footballers in Italy
Association football wingers